German submarine U-1065 was a Type VIIC/41 U-boat of Nazi Germany's Kriegsmarine during World War II.

She was ordered	on 14 October 1941, and was laid down on 23 September 1943 at Friedrich Krupp Germaniawerft, Kiel, as yard number 702. She was launched on 3 August 1944 and commissioned under the command of Oberleutnant zur See Johannes Panitz on 23 September of that year.

Design
German Type VIIC/41 submarines were preceded by the heavier Type VIIC submarines. U-1065 had a displacement of  when at the surface and  while submerged. She had two shafts and two  propellers.

U-1065 was fitted with five  torpedo tubes (four fitted at the bow and one at the stern), fourteen torpedoes, one  SK C/35 naval gun, (220 rounds), one  Flak M42 and two  C/30 anti-aircraft guns. The boat had a complement of between forty-four and sixty.

Service history

U-1065 had a very short career. While she was commissioned on 23 September 1944, she was not assigned to a flotilla until 1 April 1945. She spent the intervening six months training with the 5th U-boat Flotilla. At the end of her training, she was formally assigned to the same flotilla. She began her first patrol on 4 April 1945, but was sunk after only six days at sea.

First patrol and loss
U-1065's first patrol took her from her home port of Kiel in northern Germany towards occupied Norway. However, while en route to Norway in company with another of the Flotilla's boats, the two submarines were detected and attacked in the Skagerrak strait by 34 de Havilland Mosquito aircraft from three separate Royal Air Force squadrons. During the attack, U-1065 was able to shoot down one of the Mosquitos with her anti-aircraft guns. However, she was then hit by several rockets from 10 separate Mosquitos from 143 and 235 Squadron; she exploded and sank with the loss of her entire crew of 45 men.

The accompanying vessel, U-804, was also hit by rockets from the Mosquitos during the altercation. She exploded and rapidly sank with the loss of her entire crew of 55 men.

See also
 Battle of the Atlantic (1939-1945)

References

Bibliography

German Type VIIC/41 submarines
U-boats commissioned in 1944
U-boats sunk in 1945
World War II submarines of Germany
1944 ships
World War II shipwrecks in the Kattegat
U-boats sunk by British aircraft
Ships built in Kiel
Ships lost with all hands
Maritime incidents in April 1945